The 5th Squadron was a squadron of the 4th Air Wing of the Japan Air Self-Defense Force based at Matsushima Air Base, in Iwate Prefecture, Japan. It was equipped with North American F-86F Sabre aircraft.

History
On February 1, 1957, the 5th Squadron, along with the 4th, were formed at Hamamatsu Air Base in Shizuoka Prefecture as part of the 1st Air Wing. Over 1957 and 1958 it transferred to Matsushima Air Base in Iwate Prefecture, and served as a training squadron. From March 1, 1962 it became a regular frontline squadron. 

It was disbanded on July 1, 1971. At that time the type, the 1st through 11th Squadrons used  F-86F fighters.

Aircraft operated

Fighter aircraft
 North American F-86F Sabre（1957-1971）

See also
 Fighter units of the Japan Air Self-Defense Force

References

Units of the Japan Air Self-Defense Force